Hermenegildo Divaldo Pedro Mieze Mbunga (born 4 September 1985) is an Angolan retired basketball player.

College career
Mbunga played collegiately with the Montana State Bobcats in the United States. After two years at Peninsula Junior College, Mbunga transferred to Montana State in 2007. In 2007-08, Mbunga averaged 12 points per game and 5.5 rebounds in 26 minutes per game.

National team career
Mbunga was offered a spot on the Angola national basketball team for the 2008 Summer Olympics but declined, citing academic concerns.

See also
 Angola national basketball team

References

1985 births
Living people
Angolan men's basketball players
Angolan expatriate basketball people in the United States
Centers (basketball)
Junior college men's basketball players in the United States
Atlético Petróleos de Luanda basketball players
Montana State Bobcats men's basketball players
Basketball players from Luanda
African Games gold medalists for Angola
African Games medalists in basketball
2010 FIBA World Championship players
Competitors at the 2015 African Games
2019 FIBA Basketball World Cup players